Lancashire County Cricket Club was founded in 1864. The club played its initial first-class match against Middlesex at Old Trafford on 20 to 22 July 1865. Lancashire is one of eighteen clubs that play in the County Championship at first-class level. The player appointed club captain leads the team in all fixtures, except if unavailable, and the following 36 cricketers have held the post since it was instituted in 1866.

Club captains
 Edmund Rowley 1866–1879
 A. N. Hornby 1880–1893, 1897–1898
 Archie MacLaren 1894–1896, 1899–1907
 A. H. Hornby 1908–1914 
 Myles Kenyon 1919–1922
 Jack Sharp 1923–1925
 Leonard Green 1926–1928
 Peter Eckersley 1929–1935
 Lionel Lister 1936–1939 
 Jack Iddon 1946 (captain-elect, but killed in a road accident just before the season began)
 Jack Fallows 1946
 Ken Cranston 1947–1948
 Nigel Howard 1949–1953
 Cyril Washbrook 1954–1959
 Bob Barber 1960–1961
 Joe Blackledge 1962
 Ken Grieves 1963–1964
 Brian Statham 1965–1967
 Jack Bond 1968–1972
 David Lloyd 1973–1977
 Frank Hayes 1978–1980
 Clive Lloyd 1981–1983, 1986
 John Abrahams 1984–1985
 David Hughes 1987–1991
 Neil Fairbrother 1992–1993
 Mike Watkinson 1994–1997
 Wasim Akram 1998
 John Crawley 1999–2001
 Warren Hegg 2002–2004
 Mark Chilton 2005–2007
 Stuart Law 2008
 Glen Chapple 2009–2014
 Tom Smith 2015
 Steven Croft 2016-2017
 Liam Livingstone 2018
 Dane Vilas 2019 to date

Lancashire-born captains
20 Lancashire-born players have captained the club as follows:

 Bob Barber (born Manchester) 1960–1961
 Joe Blackledge (born Chorley) 1962
 Jack Bond (born Bolton) 1968–1972
 Ken Cranston (born Liverpool) 1947–1948
 Steven Croft (born Blackpool) 2015-2017
 Peter Eckersley (born Newton-le-Willows) 1929–1935
 Neil Fairbrother (born Warrington) 1992–1993
 Leonard Green (born Whalley) 1926–1928
 Frank Hayes (born Preston) 1978–1980
 A. N. Hornby (born Blackburn) 1880–1893, 1897–1898
 Warren Hegg (born Manchester) 2002–2004
 David Hughes (born Newton-le-Willows) 1987–1991
 Myles Kenyon (born Bury)1919–1922
 Lionel Lister (born Formby) 1936–1939 
 David Lloyd (born Accrington) 1973–1977
 Archie MacLaren (born Manchester) 1894–1896, 1899–1907
 Edmund Rowley (born Manchester) 1866–1879
 Brian Statham (born Manchester) 1965–1967
 Cyril Washbrook (born Clitheroe) 1954–1959
 Mike Watkinson (born Westhoughton) 1994–1997
 Liam Livingstone (born Barrow-in-Furness) 2018

See also
 List of Lancashire County Cricket Club players

Notes

Lancashire
Lancashire County Cricket Club
Lancashire
Cricketers